Sonnet 50 is one of 154 sonnets written by the English playwright and poet William Shakespeare. It is a member of the Fair Youth sequence, in which the poet expresses his love towards a young man. It is continued in Sonnet 51.

Structure
Sonnet 50 is an English or Shakespearean sonnet, containing three quatrains followed by a final rhyming couplet. It follows the form's typical rhyme scheme, ABAB CDCD EFEF GG, and is written in iambic pentameter, a type of poetic metre based on five pairs of metrically weak/strong syllabic positions per line. The first line exemplifies a regular iambic pentameter:

 ×   /  ×  / ×  /   ×  /    ×  / 
How heavy do I journey on the way, (50.1)
/ = ictus, a metrically strong syllabic position. × = nonictus.

The meter demands some variant pronunciations of words. In line seven, the second syllable is stressed in "instínct". In line five "tired" is two syllables, and in line eight "being" is one.

Interpretations
Gemma Jones, for the 2002 compilation album, When Love Speaks (EMI)

Notes

Further reading

External links
Analysis

British poems
Sonnets by William Shakespeare